Dhaneswar Swain (born 18 May 1953) is an exponent and Guru of the Odissi Mardala, the traditional percussion instrument of Odissi music. He is known for his rhythmic compositions and fingering techniques, as well as his efforts to promote solo Mardala recitals and group presentations combining traditional percussive instruments of Odisha. He is the founder of Vadya Vani Gurukula, an institution for training and research in Odissi Mardala and other traditional percussion instruments of Odisha.

Born in the village of Nahantara in the Puri district of Odisha to father Sambhunatha Swain and mother Kanchana Swain, he received his initial training in the Mardala from his elder brother Bhramabara Swain. He then joined the Utkal Sangeet Mahavidyalaya in 1970 and trained under renowned Gurus Singhari Shyamsundar Kar and Banamali Maharana. He also learned from Guru Mahadev Rout. After working with the renowned Odissi danseuse Sonal Mansingh for an year, in 1979, he joined the Mahavidyalaya as a Mardala teacher and worked there for over three decades. After retirement, he is engaged in teaching students at the Ramhari Das Odissi Gurukula, Biragobindapur, Puri district. Through SPIC MACAY, Guru Swain has taken Odissi Mardala to many educational institutions across the country.

He has accompanied Odissi music recitals. He has also accompanied Odissi dancers since the 1980s, travelling as the primary percussionist, performing all over India and in the United States, Germany, Spain, Belgium, Denmark, Norway, Finland, China, Singapore, Malaysia, South Korea, Jordan, and Israel, Dubai. 

Swain is known for his pioneering efforts in order to present the Mardala as a solo instrument in its own right, and he has given Mardala recitals at various prestigious forums across the country such as the Rajarani music festival, Konarka Natyamandap, Sankat Mochan Festival, Haridas Sangeet Samaroh, All India Radio Sangeet Sammelan and Sangeet Sandhya at the India Habitat Centre. He is an A-grade artist of Doordarshan & All India Radio.

He is known for his rhythm compositions for Odissi dance and has created music for a number of choreographic works such as Panchadeva Stuti, Dasamahavidya, Yuge Yuge Jagannatha, Sristi o Pralaya, Sapta Tala, Mana Madhuri, Gita Govinda, Tala Madhurya, Sabda Nrutya, Abartana Bibartana, Badya Madhuri, Jagyansenu, Varsha Abhisara, Krupanidhana, etc. He has composed the rhythm for multiple pallavis such as Kamodi, Kedara Kamodi, Mukhari, Debagandhari, Chandrika Kamodi, Anandabhairabi, Sankarabharana, Madhyamadi, Arabhi, Bakulabharana, Hansakalyani, Hansadhwani, Khambaja, Ragesri, Bajrakanti, etc. Apart from this, a CD of his rhythmic compositions titled Vadya Vani, comprising three traditional instruments of Odisha namely Mardala, Mrudanga and Khanjani, has received appreciation from connoisseurs of tala. He has published research articles and conducted several workshops on the Mardala.

He has been honoured for his work with the title Badyashree conferred by the Utkal Sahitya Kala Parishad in 1999.

For his contributions to Odissi music and Odissi Mardala, he received the Odisha Sangeet Natak Akademi award in 2008 and the Sangeet Natak Akademi award in 2013.

Articles 

Listed below are some research articles authored by Guru Dhaneswar Swain. He is presently authoring a book on Mardala, soon to be published.
 Odissi Mardala
 Ekaka Badana Ra Srunkhala
 Odissi Sangita Ra Tala
 Mardala : Nrutya Sangita Ra Eka Pramukha Anga
 Tala Hin Sangita Ra Prana
 Odisha Ra Sanskrutika Parampara Re Mardala
 Prachina Tala Paddhati
 Odissi Nrutya Ra Tala Sambhara
 Prayogika Alankara
 Development of Mardala in Odisha

Awards and recognitions 

 Sangeet Natak Akademi award (2013)
 Odisha Sangeet Natak Akademi award (2008)
Madeli Samman
Gandharva Kala Samman
Debaprasad Kalatirtha, Berhampur (1997)
Utkal Sahitya Kala Parishad, Cuttack (1999)
Rudrakshya Saptabarnna
Indian Art Research Center
Mahadeb Rout Nakhyatra Gurukula
Sur Singar Sansad, Mumbai
Mardala Academy, Bhubaneswar (2003)
Badya Vinod Kshetramohan Kar Samman (2003)
Sangita Sudhakara Balakrushna Dash foundation (2006, 2018)
Akhil Bharatiya Gandharva Mahavidyalaya Mandal (2006)
Singhari Satabarsiki Samman (2008)
Shreekhetra Madeli Sri Samman (2008)
Vedvyas Sangeet Nrutyostav (2009)
Guru Pankaj Samman, Guru Pankaj Charan Odissi Research Foundation (2011)
Guru Srinath Raut Award (2012)
Gangadhara Meher Kala Samman, Gangadhar Meher Pratisthana (2012)
Guru Gopal Panda Odishi Academy (2013, 2015, 2019)
Odissi Bikasa Parisada, Nimapada, Puri (2014)
Sudra Muni Samman (2015)
Jogendranath Pati Smruti Sambardhana (2015)
Guru Birabara Sahoo Prativa Samman (2016)
Guru Debaprasad Samman (2018)
Guru Gangadhar Smruti Samman (2018)
Satyabadi Samman, Satyabadi Sangeet Mahavidyalaya (2018)
Guru Debaprasad Das award (2019)
Nikhila Utkala Sangita Silpi Parisada (2020)
Mahodadhi Samman
Kabi Samrat Upendra Bhanja Samman
Nikhila Utkala Pala Gayaka Parisad
Sri Nrutya Samman
Bagdevi Samman
Guru Sahadev Padhi Samman
Odisha Dance Akademy

See also 

 Odissi music
 Mardala
 Gita Govinda
 Gitaprakasa

References

External links 
 YouTube channel of Vadya Vani Gurukula (containing multiple performance clips of Guru Dhaneswar Swain)

Odissi music
1953 births
Living people
Odissi Mardala
Mardala players
Recipients of the Sangeet Natak Akademi Award
Recipients of the Odisha Sangeet Natak Akademi award
People from Puri district
Disciples of Singhari Shyamsundar Kar